Friedrich Weber, Dr. (30 January 1892 – 19 July 1955) was an instructor in veterinary medicine at the University of Munich. In World War I he served in the Royal Bavarian 1st Heavy Cavalry Regiment "Prince Karl of Bavaria". He was the leader of the Oberland League and ranked alongside Adolf Hitler, Erich Ludendorff, Ernst Röhm and Hermann Kriebel as one of the chief conspirators of the Beer Hall Putsch in November 1923. He was convicted along with Hitler in 1925 but continued to head the Oberland League until 1929.

After his release from prison, he set up a private vet practice in Munich and continued close contact with Hitler being given a lucrative position in Berlin after Hitler's accession to power in 1933. He became an army vet late in World War II. After the war, he was heavily fined for war profiteering, but continued to practise veterinary medicine, eventually dying in reduced circumstances in 1955.

See also
List SS-Gruppenführer

1892 births
1954 deaths
Nazis who participated in the Beer Hall Putsch
20th-century Freikorps personnel
Academic staff of the Ludwig Maximilian University of Munich
German veterinarians
SS-Gruppenführer
Physicians from Frankfurt
German Army personnel of World War I
German Army personnel of World War II